Jamie Bick (born January 11, 2000, Bergisch Gladbach, Germany) is a German actress.

Life  
Bick was born on January 11, 2000, in Bergisch Gladbach, Germany. She began her career at the age of 2, appearing in advertising campaigns for Haribo and Toggo. She appeared in three episodes of the TV series Alarm für Cobra 11 – Die Autobahnpolizei. Her film career began with Ob ihr wollt oder nicht (2009); her role was uncredited. Her first starring role was as Pia in Yoko (2012). In 2011, she portrayed Helene Steinbrück in Die Vampirschwestern. In 2016, she portrayed Anne Frank's childhood friend Hannah Pick-Goslar in Das Tagebuch der Anne Frank.

Education 
Bick is taking acting lessons in Cologne, and studies singing in her free time.

Filmography 
 2006: Stolberg (episode: "Vaterliebe"; uncredited)
 2008–2012: Alarm für Cobra 11 – Die Autobahnpolizei (3 episodes; uncredited)
 2009: Ob ihr wollt oder nicht (uncredited)
 2012: Yoko
 2012: Unter Frauen
 2012: online – meine Tochter in Gefahr (TV film)
 2012: Die Vampirschwestern
 2013: 
 2013: Inga Lindström (episode: "Herz aus Eis")
 2014: Die Vampirschwestern 2 – Fledermäuse im Bauch
 2014-2017: Cologne P.D. (3 episodes)
 2015: Cactus and Mimosa (short)
 2016: Die Truckerin (TV film)
 2016: SOKO Leipzig (episode: "Bilder im Kopf")
 2016: Das Tagebuch der Anne Frank
 2016: Let's talk. Weil Meinung zählt! (episode: "Da muss man was tun!")
 2016: Die Vampirschwestern 3 – Reise nach Transsilvanien
 2016: Heavenly Bonds (4 episodes)
 2017-2019:  (2 episodes)
 2017: It's Your Turn, Honey!
 2017: Loverboy
 2018: Bettys Diagnose (episode: "Verletzte Gefühle")
 2018: Tatverdacht: Team Frankfurt ermittelt (episode: "Hilferuf")
 2019: Dem Horizont so nah 
 2019: Tatort (episode: "Lakritz")

External links

References 

German actresses
2000 births
Living people